Dorasque may be,

Dorasque people
Dorasque language